Strawberry Shortcake and the Baby Without a Name is an 1984 American animated television special that first premiered on March 24, 1984, in New York City and on March 30 in Los Angeles, California. This is the second Strawberry Shortcake television special produced by Nelvana and the fifth to feature the American Greetings character.

Synopsis
Strawberry Shortcake and the Baby Without a Name chronicles Strawberry Shortcake's annual summer camping trip, where she and her friends encounter a monster in the woods. The Peculiar Purple Pie Man and Sour Grapes attempt to capture it to become rich and famous.

Cast

Production
As with Housewarming Surprise, Bernard Loomis and Carole MacGillvray served as executive producers on Baby Without a Name.

Release
The special aired on March 24, 1984, on WCBS-TV in New York City, and on March 30 on KTLA in Los Angeles.

Home media
A VHS cassette of this special was released in 1984 by Family Home Entertainment.

See also
 List of 1980s Strawberry Shortcake specials

Notes

References

External links
 
 Bit the Dust Tape - QuickTime files of the first five specials

1984 television films
1984 films
1980s American animated films
1984 animated films
1984 television specials
Animated television specials
Canadian television specials
Strawberry Shortcake films
Nelvana television specials